Prescott was a federal electoral district represented in the House of Commons of Canada from 1867 to 1953. It was located in the province of Ontario. It was created by the British North America Act of 1867, and consisted of the County of Prescott.

The electoral district was abolished in 1952 when it was merged into Glengarry—Prescott riding.

Members of Parliament

This riding elected the following members of the House of Commons of Canada:

Election results

|- 
  
|Liberal
|Albert Hagar
|align="right"| 1,205   
 
|Unknown
|Thomas Higginson
|align="right"|130    
|}

|- 
  
|Liberal
|Albert Hagar
|align="right"| acclaimed   
|}

|- 
  
|Liberal
|Albert Hagar
|align="right"|665   
 
|Unknown
|T. White Jr.
|align="right"|659    
 
|Unknown
|J. Boyd
|align="right"|292    
|}

|- 
  
|Conservative
|Félix Routhier
|align="right"|875    
  
|Liberal
|Albert Hagar
|align="right"|870   
 
|Unknown
|Angus Urquhart
|align="right"|661   
|}

|- 
  
|Liberal
|Simon Labrosse
|align="right"| 1,322   
  
|Conservative
|Félix Routhier
|align="right"| 1,021    
|}

|- 
  
|Liberal
|Simon Labrosse
|align="right"| 1,414   
  
|Conservative
|Félix Routhier
|align="right"|1,223    
|}

|- 
  
|Liberal
|Isidore Proulx
|align="right"|1,269   
  
|Conservative
|Félix Routhier
|align="right"| 608    
 
|Unknown
|E. A. Johnson
|align="right"|532    
 
|Unknown
|David Bertrand
|align="right"|335    
|}

|- 
  
|Liberal
|Isidore Proulx
|align="right"| acclaimed   
|}

|- 
  
|Liberal
|Isidore Proulx
|align="right"| 1,334   
 
|Patrons of Industry
|Henry Joseph Cloran
|align="right"| 996   
  
|Conservative
|Dosithé Sabourin
|align="right"|902    
|}

|- 
  
|Liberal
|Isidore Proulx
|align="right"| 1,596   
  
|Liberal
|Henry Joseph Cloran
|align="right"| 1,177   
  
|Conservative
|Dosithé Sabourin
|align="right"|1,049    
|}

|- 
  
|Liberal
|Edmond Proulx
|align="right"| 2,388   
  
|Conservative
|L. Charbonneau
|align="right"|1,323    
|}

|- 
  
|Liberal
|Edmond Proulx
|align="right"|  2,527   
 
|Independent
|Eugène-Grégoire Quesnel
|align="right"|1,070   
|}

|- 
  
|Liberal
|Edmond Proulx
|align="right"| 2,532   
  
|Nationalist Conservative
|Eugène-Grégoire Quesnel 
|align="right"| 1,220    
|}

|- 
  
|Opposition (Laurier Liberals)
|Edmond Proulx
|align="right"| 3,743   
  
|Government (Unionist)
|Andrew Richard Metcalfe
|align="right"|1,439   
|}

|- 

 
|Independent Liberal
|Edmond Proulx
|align="right"| 2,764    
  
|Liberal
|Amédée Sabourin
|align="right"| 2,359   
|}

|- 
  
|Liberal
|Gustave Évanturel
|align="right"|  4,198   
 
|Independent Liberal
|Joseph-Napoléon Coupal
|align="right"| 2,519   
  
|Conservative
|Hiram Horton Kirby
|align="right"|2,387    
|}

|- 
 
|Independent Liberal
|Louis-Mathias Auger
|align="right"| 3,846   
  
|Liberal
|Gustave Évanturel
|align="right"|  3,134   
  
|Conservative
|Hiram Horton Kirby
|align="right"| 2,504    
 
|Independent
|Raoul Labrosse
|align="right"|635   
|}

|- 
  
|Liberal
|Élie-Oscar Bertrand
|align="right"| 5,152   
 
|Independent Liberal
|Gustave Gustave Évanturel
|align="right"| 3,562    
|}

|- 
  
|Liberal
|Élie-Oscar Bertrand
|align="right"| 6,572   
  
|Conservative
|Edmund Alexander Mooney
|align="right"| 2,326    
|}

|- 
  
|Liberal
|Élie-Oscar Bertrand
|align="right"| 6,034   
 
|Independent Liberal
|Louis-Mathias Auger
|align="right"|3,620    
  
|Conservative
|Joseph Saint-Denis
|align="right"| 1,614    
|}

|- 
  
|Liberal
|Élie-Oscar Bertrand
|align="right"| 6,431   
 
|Independent Liberal
|Léandre Maisonneuve
|align="right"| 2,028    
 
|National Government
|Parnell Tierney
|align="right"| 1,819    
|}

  
|Liberal
|Élie-Oscar Bertrand
|align="right"|  6,623   
  
|Progressive Conservative
|Louis-Pierre Cécile
|align="right"| 1,753    

 
|Co-operative Commonwealth
|Bernard Dupuis
|align="right"|408   
|}

|- 
 
|Independent Liberal
|Raymond Bruneau
|align="right"|5,380    
  
|Liberal
|Élie-Oscar Bertrand
|align="right"|4,148   
  
|Progressive Conservative
|Joseph Saint-Denis
|align="right"| 1,928    
|}

See also 
 List of Canadian federal electoral districts
 Past Canadian electoral districts

External links 
 Website of the Parliament of Canada

Former federal electoral districts of Ontario